Duckmaloi Road (and at its western end through Oberon as Oberon Street) is a  rural road in Australia linking Oberon to Jenolan Caves Road just south of Hampton.

Route
Oberon Street starts at the intersection with Carrington Avenue and North Street in central Oberon and heads east, changing name to Duckmaloi Road at the intersection with Tarana Road in eastern Oberon, before descending to cross Fish River Creek. It passes to the north of the village of Duckmaloi, then crosses the Duckmaloi River and ascends up and passes the Hampton State Forest which lies north of the road. It terminates at the intersection with Jenolan Caves Road 4 km (2.5 mi) south of Hampton.

It is fully sealed with two lanes in each direction, with the occasional overtaking lane.

History
The passing of the Main Roads Act of 1924 through the Parliament of New South Wales provided for the declaration of Main Roads, roads partially funded by the State government through the Main Roads Board (later the Department of Main Roads, and eventually Transport for NSW). Main Road No. 558 was declared along this road on 1 March 1950, from the intersection with Oberon-Tarana Road in Oberon to the intersection with Hartley-Jenolan Caves Road near Hampton).

The passing of the Roads Act of 1993 updated road classifications and the way they could be declared within New South Wales. Under this act, Duckmaloi Road today retains its declaration as Main Road 558.

Upgrade
The road has seen some upgrades in its history including:

 A new two-lane concrete bridge over the Duckmaloi River, built by the Department of Main Roads, 1963.
 A new two-lane concrete bridge over Fish River Creek, built by the Roads & Traffic Authority, 1990.
 Upgrade of the Duckmaloi River bridge, done by Roads and Maritime Services and Transport for NSW, 2019.

In 2021, then Minister for Regional Transport and Roads Paul Toole announced $1.5 million in upgrades for Duckmaloi Road including:

 vehicle-activated signs
 curve alignment markers
 improved sealed road shoulders on curves
 a full-width traversable clear zone
 roadside barriers and profile edge and centre lines

Major intersections

References

Roads in New South Wales